Pi-HaHiroth ( Pī haḤīrōṯ),  is the fourth station of the Exodus mentioned in . The fifth and sixth stations Marah and Elim are located on the Red Sea. The biblical books Exodus and Numbers refer to Pi-HaHiroth as the place where the Israelites encamped between Migdol and the sea, opposite Baal Zephon, while awaiting an attack by Pharaoh, prior to crossing the Red Sea. Reaching Pi-HaHiroth involved turning back from the direction they had been traveling and going south directly opposite of God's preferred proximate destination of Kadesh Barnea at the entrance to the Philistine territory, which was done in order to gain time to boost the morale of the Israelites; their ultimate destination was the Abrahamic city of Hebron, east of the Philistine capital Gaza.

Etymology
Those positing a Hebrew name have speculated "Pi-HaHiroth" might mean "mouth of the gorges", descriptive of its location as the end of a canal or river.  In fact, part of the mystery may be resolved by understanding the initial syllable ′Pi,′ which corresponds to the Egyptian word Ipi or Ipu, as house of such as in ′Pithom′ or ′Pi-Ramesses′. The next literary fragment ′Ha′ would indicate the ′desert hills or mountains to the west′ normally associated with Libya, but a more ethereal rendering could possibly indicate the prominent mountainous range west of Nuweiba Beach on the West coast of the Gulf of Aqaba.

The Revised Version of the Bible at the first use of the name Pi-HaHiroth has a link to a footnote that says "Or, where the desert tracks begin".

Identification
William Smith, in his Dictionary of Greek and Roman Geography, tentatively identifies Pi-HaHiroth with Arsinoe, Egypt at the northern end of the Gulf of Suez. Strong's Concordance simply locates Pi-HaHiroth as 'a place on the eastern border of Egypt'.

The physicist Colin Humphreys believes that Pi-HaHiroth was along the Gulf of Aqaba.

References

Egypt in the Hebrew Bible
Book of Exodus
Book of Numbers